Faraz Akram (born 3 October 1993) is a Zimbabwean cricketer. Akram was born in Saudi Arabia to Pakistani parents, and made his international debut for the Zimbabwe cricket team in November 2020.

Personal life
Faraz Akram was born on 3 October 1993 in Jeddah, Saudi Arabia to Pakistani parents. Raised in the Middle East and Pakistan, he moved with his family to Zimbabwe in 2000, where his diplomat father worked at the Pakistani embassy. Akram attended Westridge High School in Harare. He became the second Pakistani-origin player to represent Zimbabwe in international cricket, following Sikander Raza.

Career
He made his first-class debut for Rising Stars in the 2017–18 Logan Cup on 4 October 2017. He made his List A debut for Rising Stars in the 2017–18 Pro50 Championship on 17 April 2018. For the 2018–19 season, Akram moved to the Mashonaland Eagles.

In June 2018, he was named in a Board XI team for warm-up fixtures ahead of the 2018 Zimbabwe Tri-Nation Series. In September 2018, he was named in Zimbabwe's squad for the 2018 Africa T20 Cup tournament. He made his Twenty20 debut for Zimbabwe in the 2018 Africa T20 Cup on 14 September 2018.

In October 2020, he was named in Zimbabwe's squad for their tour of Pakistan. He made his Twenty20 International (T20I) debut for Zimbabwe, against Pakistan, on 10 November 2020.

In December 2020, he was selected to play for the Eagles in the 2020–21 Logan Cup. In May 2021, he was named in Zimbabwe A's squad for their home series against South Africa A.

References

External links
 

1993 births
Living people
Pakistani emigrants to Zimbabwe
Pakistani expatriates in Saudi Arabia
Zimbabwean cricketers
Zimbabwe Twenty20 International cricketers
Sportspeople from Jeddah
Rising Stars cricketers
Mashonaland Eagles cricketers